Kim Chung-sim (born 27 November 1990) is a North Korean football midfielder who plays for the North Korea women's national football team. She competed at the 2012 Summer Olympics and 2011 FIFA Women's World Cup. At the club level, she played for April 25.

International goals

Under-19

See also
 North Korea at the 2012 Summer Olympics

References

External links

 

1990 births
Living people
North Korean women's footballers
Place of birth missing (living people)
Footballers at the 2012 Summer Olympics
Olympic footballers of North Korea
Women's association football midfielders
Asian Games medalists in football
Footballers at the 2010 Asian Games
North Korea women's international footballers
Asian Games silver medalists for North Korea
Medalists at the 2010 Asian Games
2011 FIFA Women's World Cup players
21st-century North Korean women